The Capture of Chihuahua took place on 15 August 1865, during the Second French intervention in Mexico. General Augustin Brincourt Henri, with French troops under his command, took Chihuahua City in Chihuahua State, Mexico, from the Republicans on behalf of the Second Mexican Empire.

References

Capture of Chihuahua (1865)
1865 in Mexico
Battles of the Second French intervention in Mexico
August 1865 events